Keith Walter Wilson Ewert (12 April 1918 – 2 December 1989) was an Australian politician. Born in Brighton and educated at Melbourne High School and the University of Melbourne, he was an accountant before entering politics. In 1952, Ewert was elected to the Australian House of Representatives as the Labor member for Flinders, unexpectedly winning the by-election for that seat caused by the death of Rupert Ryan, becoming only the second Labor MP for Flinders. In 1954, he was defeated by Liberal Robert Lindsay.

In 1955, 1958 and 1961, Ewert was the Labor candidate for the nearby seat of Bruce, losing each time to Liberal Billy Snedden.  On the third attempt, Ewert actually led in the first count, but was defeated by DLP preferences.

After his final defeat, Ewert resumed his accountancy practice.  He died in 1989.

References

Australian Labor Party members of the Parliament of Australia
Members of the Australian House of Representatives for Flinders
Members of the Australian House of Representatives
1918 births
1989 deaths
20th-century Australian politicians
People from Brighton, Victoria
People educated at Melbourne High School
Politicians from Melbourne
Australian accountants
University of Melbourne alumni politicians